Postbox is a desktop email client, news client and feed reader for Windows and macOS. Written and sold by Postbox, Inc., it was launched at the TechCrunch 50 conference in 2008.

Postbox was founded and staffed by several former developers from Mozilla. The software was built using Mozilla's Gecko browser engine, and was initially based on Thunderbird, Mozilla's own e-mail software.

Postbox 7 requires 8GB of RAM, 200 MB of hard drive space, plus Windows 8 (or later) or macOS 10.13 (or later). The Windows version runs in 32-bit-mode on 32-bit and 64-bit systems.

References

External links
 Official website
 Older version downloads

Email clients
Computer-related introductions in 2008